Luna Lovegood is a fictional character in the Harry Potter book series by J. K. Rowling. She first appears in Harry Potter and the Order of the Phoenix, where she is described as having straggly, waist-length dirty-blond hair and a dazed, dreamy look on her face. 

Luna is played by Irish actress Evanna Lynch in the film adaptations of Harry Potter and the Order of the Phoenix, Harry Potter and the Half-Blood Prince, and both Harry Potter and the Deathly Hallows – Part 1 and Part 2. On her website, Rowling called Lynch "perfect" for the role. 
Lynch had to bleach her hair light blond in order to play the role, and has received critical acclaim.

Character development

Rowling has often said that Luna is the "anti-Hermione", as Luna believes things on faith alone, while Hermione grounds her views on facts and logic. Hermione repeatedly tries to convince Luna that her beliefs are nonsense, but to no avail. This is not to suggest that Luna is foolish; indeed, as a Ravenclaw, she believes that "wit beyond measure is man's greatest treasure". Hermione sees Luna as gullible, whereas Luna views Hermione as smart, but limited. Though they have different views, Luna and Hermione eventually become friends.

Despite her quirkiness, Luna is often perceptive about human nature, and Harry notes her knack for blunt honesty. She also holds her friends in extremely high regard, as Harry notices (with affection) that she has painted portraits of her friends (Harry, Ron, Hermione, Ginny, and Neville) on the ceiling of her room, connected by chains made of the word "friendship" repeated over and over. Clearly, and despite recurring rudeness from Ron and Hermione, she regards these five as people very close to her.

Both Luna's parents are magical. Her father, Xenophilius Lovegood, first appears in Harry Potter and the Deathly Hallows, though Luna earlier identifies him as the editor-in-chief of The Quibbler, a magazine that, according to Luna, publishes "important stories he thinks the public needs to know". Luna says her mother was an extraordinary witch who died when a spell experiment went wrong. Luna saw the death of her mother when she was only nine and so she can see Thestrals. Luna appears to be an only child as no mention is made of siblings. The Lovegoods live near Ottery St. Catchpole, a small village on the south coast of England that is also home to the Weasley family.

Appearances

Harry Potter and the Order of the Phoenix
Luna first appears in Harry Potter and the Order of the Phoenix when Harry, Ginny, and Neville join her in a compartment on the Hogwarts Express. Luna is isolated at school, but she seems to care little for what others think. She is aware of the nickname everyone calls her—but by which she seems to be unperturbed—"Loony"—by which she is widely known among the students, and is largely unfazed when her classmates tease her by regularly stealing and hiding her possessions. Nevertheless, she values her few friends. 

Harry, during this particularly turbulent year of his life, forms a strong friendship with Luna, who is the only person who can quell his anger and calm him down when many of his closer friends cannot, and she supports Harry many times during the series. She and her father, Xenophilius, believe Harry and Albus Dumbledore when they claim that Lord Voldemort has returned; with Hermione, Luna persuades Rita Skeeter to interview Harry so that his views can be published in The Quibbler, the magazine to which Luna's father is the editor. Luna also joins Dumbledore's Army, and later in the book joins Harry, Ron, Hermione, Ginny, and Neville in the conflict with Death Eaters at the Ministry of Magic Department of Mysteries and, when she is separated from Harry along with Ron and Ginny, appears to be the only one uninjured until hit by a stunning spell. Towards the end of the book, Luna consoles Harry by sharing her views on death after the loss of his godfather, Sirius Black.

Harry Potter and the Half-Blood Prince
In Half-Blood Prince, Luna is first seen on the Hogwarts Express. When some other female students invite Harry to join them in their compartment by saying that he does not have to sit with Luna and Neville, implying that they are undesirable companions, Harry witheringly says, "They're friends of mine." Luna observes in her bluntly honest way that people expect someone like Harry to have "cooler friends than us". Harry's response, indicative of the increased fondness he has developed for the pair, is that she and Neville are cool.

At Christmas, Harry invites Luna on a platonic date to the party hosted by Horace Slughorn. Despite wearing a spangled silvery dress, she looks quite nice, Harry notices, and her conversation about the Rotfang conspiracy (where the Aurors are allegedly trying to bring down the Ministry via Dark Magic and gum disease) has Harry coughing into his drink with laughter. Luna also does the Quidditch commentary for Gryffindor's game against Hufflepuff during which she says little about the play – talking instead about "interestingly-shaped clouds" above the stadium and how nice Ginny is and referring to one of the Hufflepuff players as suffering from "Loser's Lurgy". Minerva McGonagall does not quite know what to do with her, but some fans find her commentary highly amusing. This wins over Ron, who remarks that Luna may be mad, but in a good way. Rowling said in an interview that she "really enjoyed" writing Luna's commentary and considered it "blinding insight".

Later, when Death Eaters attack Hogwarts, Luna, Ginny and Neville are the sole D.A. members who answer the call to protect the school. During Dumbledore's funeral, Harry feels a "great rush of affection" for both Luna and Neville as the former helps the latter into his seat.

Harry Potter and the Deathly Hallows
In Deathly Hallows, Luna and her father attend Bill and Fleur's wedding at the Burrow, where she immediately recognises Harry, even though he is disguised with Polyjuice Potion, simply by his facial expression. Luna later returns to school for her sixth year, where she and Ginny help Neville secretly revive Dumbledore's Army, to the fury of Alecto and Amycus Carrow, Death Eater siblings sent to teach at Hogwarts. During the first term, the trio break into the office of Severus Snape and try to steal the sword of Gryffindor to help Harry on his journey. They are captured and apparently punished, but the sanction is a visit to the Forbidden Forest with Rubeus Hagrid.

When Harry visits the Lovegood home, he notices several pieces of evidence that Luna hasn't been home for weeks despite it being Christmas break: dust over a photo of her and her mother, no clothes in her wardrobe, and her bed, which looks like it hasn't been slept in for some time. It is then revealed that while heading home for Christmas on the Hogwarts Express, Luna was kidnapped in an effort to keep her father from publishing information in support of Harry in The Quibbler. When Harry, Ron, and Hermione are at the Lovegood home, Xenophilius, desperate to save his only child, betrays them to the Death Eaters in the hope that doing so will secure Luna's release. The trio narrowly escapes - only to land in the cellar of Malfoy Manor as captives themselves a few months later. There, they find Luna being held hostage along with Mr Ollivander the wand maker. They are all rescued by Dobby the house elf, who brings them to Shell Cottage, the home of Bill Weasley and his wife Fleur Delacour, where protective enchantments keep them safe. 

When Harry returns to Hogwarts in search of the Ravenclaw item that Voldemort turned into a Horcrux, Luna helps him enter Ravenclaw's common room in order to view a replica of Rowena Ravenclaw's diadem. She stuns Death Eater Alecto Carrow when they are discovered. Later, she fights bravely in the Battle of Hogwarts and summons her Patronus charm to help fight off hundreds of oncoming Dementors about to attack Harry, Ron and Hermione. After Harry's supposed death, Luna, Hermione and Ginny duel Bellatrix Lestrange, until Molly Weasley takes over and defeats Bellatrix herself. Finally, Luna is among the first to congratulate Harry when Voldemort is defeated. After the battle, she seems to be the only one who sees that Harry needs peace and quiet, so she provides a distraction so that he can escape under his Cloak of Invisibility.

Life after the book series
In Rowling's first televised interview after the release of Harry Potter and the Deathly Hallows, she revealed a number of aspects of Luna's life after Hogwarts. Luna continues to be an eccentric person and pursues a career that is "the wizarding equivalent" of a naturalist. She comes to terms with her father's sometimes-false beliefs, but Rowling explains that her background has fostered in her a singular open-mindedness that allows her to make discoveries that more "reality"-oriented individuals might be unable to recognise.

In a later webchat-based interview, Rowling explained that Luna discovered many new species of animals and became quite famous for it, though she eventually was forced to admit that Crumple-Horned Snorkacks do not exist. She married a fellow naturalist, the grandson of Newt Scamander, named Rolf.

In the JKR Documentary on ITV, she drew a family tree of the new generation of Weasleys, including Luna and Rolf. They had twin boys, Lorcan and Lysander. The twins were born several years after Luna's friends had their own children. Harry and Ginny named their third child and only daughter Lily Luna after their "dear friend".

Reception
Luna quickly became a fan favourite after her initial appearance in Order of the Phoenix, due in large part to her quirky personality and happy-go-lucky attitude. IGN ranked Luna as the 12th best Harry Potter character stating, "While Luna is often shunned for her oddball ways, things change when she meets Harry Potter and friends on the Hogwarts Express on the way to their fifth year at school. Luna joins the cadre of heroic students in Dumbledore's Army and plays a critical role within the group." Empire Magazine listed Luna as the 10th best Harry Potter character. Future Academy Award–nominated actress Saoirse Ronan auditioned for the role of Luna.

References

External links

Luna's page at the Harry Potter Lexicon

Harry Potter characters
Literary characters introduced in 2003
Teenage characters in film
Teenage characters in literature
Fictional members of secret societies
Female characters in film
Female characters in literature
Fictional child soldiers
Fictional Irish people
Fictional war veterans
Film characters introduced in 2007